The 2015 OFC U-17 Championship is an association football competition for Oceanian national under-17 teams. The players called upon for the competition are listed below.

American Samoa
Head coach: Uinifareti Aliva

Cook Islands

Head coach: Delaney Yagona

Fiji

Head coach: Kamal Swamy

New Caledonia

Head coach: Kamali Fitialeata

New Zealand

Head coach: José Figueira

Papua New Guinea

Head coach: Harrison Kamake

Samoa

Head coach: Desmond Faaiuaso

Solomon Islands

Head coach: Jacob Molli

Tahiti

Head coach: Ludovic Graugnard

Tonga

Head coach: Timote Moleni

Vanuatu

Head coach: Etienne Mermer

References

squads
OFC